WFSH (1340 AM) was a radio station licensed to Valparaiso-Niceville, Florida, United States.  The station served the Ft. Walton Beach area.  The station was last owned by Flagship Communications, Inc. The station had a Sports radio format and featured programming from ESPN Radio prior to going off the air in March 2009 due to economic problems.

References

External links

FSH
Defunct radio stations in the United States
Radio stations disestablished in 2011
2009 disestablishments in Florida
Radio stations established in 2009
2011 disestablishments in Florida
FSH